The long-billed partridge (Rhizothera longirostris) is a species of bird in the family Phasianidae.

Distribution and habitat
It is found in the Malay Peninsula, Sumatra and Borneo. Its natural habitats are subtropical or tropical dry forest, subtropical or tropical moist lowland forest, and subtropical or tropical moist montane forest. It is threatened by habitat loss. There are two distinct subspecies; the nominate race R. l. longirostris is relatively widespread, while R. l. dulitensis, sometimes considered to be a full species known as the Dulit partridge or Hose's partridge (R. dulitensis), has a very restricted range in the mountains of central Borneo.

References 

long-billed partridge
Birds of Myanmar
Birds of Thailand
Birds of Malaysia
Birds of Malesia
long-billed partridge
Taxonomy articles created by Polbot